Wolford is an unincorporated community in Wolford Township, Crow Wing County, Minnesota, United States, near Crosby. It is along Crow Wing County Road 30 near River Road. State Highway 6 (MN 6) and County Road 11 are both nearby. Perry Lake Township is also in the immediate area.

Wolford was platted in 1913.

References

Unincorporated communities in Crow Wing County, Minnesota
Unincorporated communities in Minnesota